Christian Leali'ifano (born 24 September 1987), is an Australian professional rugby player. He is of Samoan heritage, and his surname is spelled Leali'ifano when using Samoan diacritics. He currently plays for Moana Pasifika in the Super Rugby Pacific competition and his usual position is inside centre or fly-half. 
In August 2016, two weeks after the Brumbies were knocked out of the Super Rugby finals, Leali'ifano was diagnosed with leukaemia. He has resumed playing after receiving a bone marrow transplant, and in 2017 signed for Ulster, who play in the Pro14, on loan. He has signed with the Moana Pasifika for the 2022 Super Rugby Pacific season.

Early life
Leali'ifano was born in Auckland, New Zealand, and moved with his family to Melbourne, Australia when he was seven years old. He attended Epping Primary School and Peter Lalor Secondary College. He played rugby union for the Australian Schoolboys team in 2004 and 2005.

Leali'ifano joined the Brumbies rugby academy program in 2006. Later that year he was selected for the Australian Under 19 and Under 21 rugby teams. He played fly-half for the Australian Under 19 rugby team that won the IRB World Championship in 2006.

Club career

In 2007, Leali'ifano signed with the Brumbies on a rookie contract. He played for the Australian Sevens rugby team, and for the Canberra Vikings in the Australian Rugby Championship in 2007.

Leali'ifano made his Super Rugby debut in 2008 against the Crusaders in Christchurch. He played fly-half in 2008 and 2009, before shifting to inside centre when Matt Giteau returned to the Brumbies in 2010. Leali'ifano played six Super 14 games for the Brumbies in 2010 before being sidelined with a knee injury (rupture to his posterior cruciate). He recovered by July to play in the ITM Cup for Waikato in 2010, and he played fourteen matches for the Brumbies in 2011.

In 2012, Leali'ifano was named Man of the Match by Super Rugby officials for eight out of the ten Super Rugby games he played. Unfortunately, he suffered a broken ankle in his tenth game which ended his season and any chance of being selected for the Wallabies in 2012.

In August 2017, after successful treatment for leukaemia, Leali'ifano signed for Irish Pro14 and European Rugby Champions Cup side Ulster on a 5-month loan deal.

For the 2022 Super Rugby Pacific season he has signed with the Moana Pasifika franchise.

On 7 May in a game against the Waratahs, Leali'ifano became the 7th player to reach 1,000 Super Rugby points.

International career
Leali'ifano's test debut for the Wallabies lasted less than one minute. On 22 June 2013, he was knocked out attempting to tackle the British and Irish Lions centre Jonathan Davies in Brisbane.

Super Rugby statistics

Reference list

External links
 
 Wallabies Profile
 

1987 births
Rugby union players from Auckland
Australian rugby union players
Australian sportspeople of Samoan descent
New Zealand emigrants to Australia
Australia international rugby union players
ACT Brumbies players
Canberra Vikings players
Rugby union centres
Rugby union fly-halves
Living people
Waikato rugby union players
Tokyo Sungoliath players
Australian expatriate rugby union players
Expatriate rugby union players in Northern Ireland
Australian expatriate sportspeople in Northern Ireland
Ulster Rugby players
Moana Pasifika players
Toyota Industries Shuttles Aichi players
Urayasu D-Rocks players
Rugby union players from Melbourne
Australian expatriate sportspeople in Japan
Expatriate ice hockey players in Australia